A registration county was, in Great Britain and Ireland, a statistical unit used for the registration of births, deaths and marriages and for the output of census information. In Scotland registration counties are used for land registration purposes.

England and Wales
The Births and Deaths Registration Act 1836 divided England and Wales into registration districts. The districts were not innovations, however, but were identical to the poor law unions already in existence. Unions had been formed by the grouping parishes surrounding towns in which a workhouse was situated without reference to geographical county boundaries. Many PLUs included areas in two or more civil counties.

Registration counties (also known as poor law counties) were formed by the aggregation of registration districts by reference to which county the workhouse was situated in. Accordingly, the boundaries of registration counties rarely coincided with those of the civil county. Attempts to establish a single set of county boundaries in the 1880s were unsuccessful.

The registration counties were used in the compilation of census results from 1851 to 1911.

Ireland
Civil registration was introduced to Ireland in 1864, based upon the English model. Registration counties were formed for statistical purposes in a similar manner by the grouping of poor law unions. Population data for the 1871 and 1881 censuses of Ireland was published for the registration counties.

Scotland
In Scotland registration districts were introduced in 1855, and registration counties were used in subsequent censuses.

34 counties are used in Scotland for land registration purposes, which is one higher than the Sasine register. The additional county, within the 34 counties, is the Sea which is used when land is being reclaimed from the ocean.

Land registration by county was introduced by the Land Registers (Scotland) Act 1868. The Act provided that in future all writs relating to lands and heritages in Scotland should be recorded in "presentment books", with a different series for each county. For the purposes of the Act the Barony and Regality of Glasgow and the Stewartry of Kirkcudbright were to be treated as counties. There are two paired counties that were under a single sheriff in 1868: Ross & Cromarty and Orkney & Zetland.

The 1868 legislation was replaced by the Land Registration (Scotland) Act 1979. The 1979 Act allowed for the date and areas of operation to be fixed by statutory instrument. It was brought into operation on a phased basis using the 1868 counties, starting with the County of Renfrew on 6 April 1981. The implementation was completed on 1 April 2003 when the final tranche of registration counties were operational.

See also
Counties of Scotland

References

External links
http://www.visionofbritain.org.uk/types/type_page.jsp?unit_type=PR_CNTY
Map of Registration counties of Scotland

Counties of the United Kingdom
Geography of the United Kingdom
Administrative divisions of Scotland